Moses ben Samuel Zuriel (Moshe ben Shmu’el Tzuri’el)  was a seventeenth-century Jewish mathematician. He was the author of Meḥaddesh Ḥodashim, a calendar for AM 5414–5434.

References

 

16th-century Jews
16th-century mathematicians